This is a list of the members of the fifth Western Cape Provincial Parliament.

See also
List of members of the 4th Western Cape Provincial Parliament

References
 

List of Members